James Martinez is an American actor, known for his role as Alex Romero in season five of the Netflix series House of Cards, and Armando Salazar on the Hulu series Love, Victor.

Career
Martinez portrayed series regular Jorge Sanchez in Gravity on Starz in 2010. In 2017, he appeared as Alex Romero in season five of the Netflix series House of Cards. Martinez portrayed Victor on the Netflix series One Day at a Time from 2017 to 2019. From 2020 to 2022, he starred as Armando Salazar on the Hulu series Love, Victor.

Selected filmography

Television

Film

Video games

References

External links
 

Living people
American male television actors
Place of birth missing (living people)
American male film actors
American people of Colombian descent
Year of birth missing (living people)